Dichromodes atrosignata is a species moth of the family Geometridae first described by Francis Walker in 1861. It is found in northern Australia.

References

Oenochrominae
Moths described in 1861